Beinn Leoid (792 m) is a mountain in the Northwest Highlands of Scotland. It lies in Sutherland, east of the village of Kylesku.

A very remote mountain, it provides fine views towards the coast from its summit.

References

Mountains and hills of the Northwest Highlands
Marilyns of Scotland
Corbetts